Tore Skau (born 5 May 1945) is a Norwegian former sports shooter. He competed in the 50 metre running target event at the 1972 Summer Olympics.

References

1945 births
Living people
Norwegian male sport shooters
Olympic shooters of Norway
Shooters at the 1972 Summer Olympics
Sportspeople from Tønsberg
20th-century Norwegian people